Romulus Bărbulescu (October 27, 1925, Sulina – February 9, 2010, Bucharest) was a Romanian science-fiction writer.

In 1963, Bărbulescu published "Constellations from the Waters," the first of 10 science fiction novels that established him and his co-author, George Anania, as pioneers of the genre in Romania. They drew their inspiration from Russian writers like Ivan Efremov or Arkady and Boris Strugatsky, or the Polish author Stanislaw Lem. In a communist society where criticizing current social norms was forbidden, alternative reality was good metaphor, and even better, safe.
In the 1980s, the government of Romanian President Nicolae Ceaușescu took control of Anania and Bărbulescu's fan clubs to monitor discussions on utopian societies and social justice.

Published books
 1983 – Catharsis, editura Albatros, Bucharest
 1991 – Încotro curge liniștea?, editura Ion Creangă, Bucharest
 1993 – Golful ucigașilor, editura Porto-Franco, Galați

With George Anania 
 Constelația din ape (1962), Colecția "Povestiri științifico-fantastice" nr. 174-179 (en. Constellations from the Waters)
 Statuia șarpelui (1967), Editura Tineretului
 Doando (1969) – Editura Tineretului
 Planeta umbrelelor albastre (1969), Colecția "Povestiri științifico-fantastice" nr. 356-359
 Ferma oamenilor de piatră (1970), Editura Tineretului (en. The Stone Men Farm)
 Paralela-enigmă (1973), Editura Tineretului
 Șarpele blând al infinitului (1977)
 Cât de mic poate fi infernul? (1993), Editura Odeon

See also
George Anania
List of Romanian science fiction writers

References

External links
 Romulus Bărbulescu at Wiki SF at Editura Nemira
 Operă literară at World Cat
  Romulus Bărbulescu at archivsf.narod.ru
  Romulus Bărbulescu

1925 births
2010 deaths
People from Sulina
Romanian science fiction writers